The Main Street District of downtown Dallas, Texas (United States) runs along Main Street and is bounded by Elm Street one block north, Commerce St. one block south, N. Lamar St. to the west, and US 75/I-45 (I-345) elevated highway to the east. The district is the spine of downtown Dallas, and connects many of the adjoining business and entertainment districts. It does not include Dealey Plaza or the John Fitzgerald Kennedy Memorial which are a few blocks west in the West End Historic District.

About 

Main Street has historically been the center of the city of Dallas. Many of Dallas' major retailers, hotels and banks once located here, and the district includes the city's early skyscrapers. Subsequent development of downtown moved north and east to the City Center District in following years, leaving many of the historic buildings inefficient for modern offices.

The Main Street District was the first district of downtown Dallas to experience extensive urban revival. Many of the grand historic buildings that had been neglected have been restored and adapted for new use. Pegasus Plaza, an urban plaza bounded by the Magnolia Hotel, Iron Cactus Restaurant, Adolphus Tower and the Kirby Building, is a gathering place for visitors and residents at the heart of the district. The narrow tree-lined street is a major pedestrian route through downtown. The district contains many sidewalk restaurants, basement night clubs and retail stores (most notably Neiman Marcus). While several of the buildings have found new life, there are many still awaiting restoration. Main Street Garden Park is a new focal park of the district's east end.

Commerce and Elm Streets, major east-west thoroughfares, form the boundaries of the district and also contain many additional landmark structures.

Completed projects 
Titche-Goettinger Building, the former Titche-Goettinger Department Store, featuring 129 apartments (1997) and the Universities Center at Dallas.
The Wilson Building, 135 apartments (1999).
Main Street lofts, 8 apartments (1999).
The Kirby Building, 156 apartments (1999).
Magnolia Hotel, 300 room hotel (1999).
The Davis Building, 183 apartments (2003).
Dallas Power and Light Complex, 158 apartments 2004.
Mercantile Bank Building + Renovation into 225 rental units with a new 15 story 150 rental units.
Dallas National Bank Building into the Joule Hotel.
The Metropolitan, 283 condo units.
Third Rail Lofts
Gulf States Building – 68 apartments.
1407 Main – 84 apartments.
1414 Elm – 14 apartments.
Pegasus Plaza
Main Street Garden Park
100 North Central Expressway
UNT Dallas College of Law
Belo Garden Park

Current and future projects 
The Statler Hotel & Residences - 159 hotel rooms, 219 apartments

Landmark Structures of the Main Street District

Education 
The district is zoned to schools in the Dallas Independent School District.

Residents of the district west of Central are zoned to City Park Elementary School, Billy Earl Dade Middle School, and Madison High School. Residents east of Central are zoned to Ignacio Zaragoza Elementary School, Alex W. Spence Middle School, and North Dallas High School.

In the fall of 2014, the University of North Texas System opened the UNT College of Law in the Titche-Goettinger Building at 1900 Elm St. / 1901 Main St. After the completion of a $70 million dollar renovation in 2019, the law school moved to the former Dallas city hall on South Harwood Street next to Main Street Garden Park. the Beaux Arts style structure opened in 1914 and once held Lee Harvey Oswald but had slowly deteriorated over the decades. As of 2020, the UNT College of Law is the only public law school in the City of Dallas.

References

External links 
 Downtown Partnership/Main Street

Transportation in Dallas County, Texas